Hans Alsér (23 January 1942 – 15 January 1977) was a Swedish international table tennis player and later the head coach of West German (1971–1974) and Swedish (1974–1977) national teams. His nickname, Hasse (Alsér or Alser), was often used in media.

Table tennis career
Hans Alsér was an international top level player. He was the European champion (singles) 1962 and 1970, World champion (doubles) 1967 and 1969, and European champion (doubles) 1966.

Hans Alsér was Swedish singles Champion six times. During the years 1960–1971 he played in the Swedish singles Championship final every year. The years when he did not become the Swedish singles Champion he was second placed. In 1967 he also became Swedish mixed double Champion with Eva Johansson.

He also won an English Open title.

His playing style was more all-round than most other players in the 1960s. He could attack close to the table but also defend far from the table. He mastered top-spin, chopping, looping and all other types of play.

Stiga (manufacturer of table tennis tables, rackets, rubber and balls) made a very popular racket with the Alsér-grip. It became thicker towards the end of the grip, decreasing the risk of the racket slipping out of the player's grip.

He died in 1977 at the age of 34 in a plane crash at Kälvesta near Stockholm.

See also
 List of table tennis players
 List of World Table Tennis Championships medalists

References

External links 
 Stiga Company History, Photo of Stellan Bengtsson, Kjell Johansson, Hans Alsér.
 Stiga Company History, the Hans Alsér racket.

1942 births
1977 deaths
People from Borås
Swedish male table tennis players
Swedish table tennis coaches
Victims of aviation accidents or incidents in Sweden
Sportspeople from Västra Götaland County
Victims of aviation accidents or incidents in 1977